Lanceirosphenodon is an extinct genus of sphenodontian from the Late Triassic Candelária Formation of Brazil. It contains a single species, Lanceirosphenodon ferigoloi.

References 

Sphenodontia
Prehistoric reptile genera
Fossil taxa described in 2021